Salvatore Peter Cimino (born October 27, 1933) is an American politician who served one term in the Massachusetts House of Representatives. He lost reelection in 1980 to Marie Parente, who challenged him as an independent.

References

External links

Democratic Party members of the Massachusetts House of Representatives
1933 births
Living people
Cornell University alumni
20th-century American politicians
21st-century American politicians